Phragmataecia purpureus is a species of moth of the family Cossidae described by Thomas Bainbrigge Fletcher in 1927. It is found in Bihar, India.

References

Moths described in 1927
Phragmataecia